Penstemon laevigatus, the eastern smooth beardtongue, is a plant in the plantain family, Plantaginaceae. The flowers are borne in summer.  Its native range includes much of the Eastern United States, from Maine to Michigan and Georgia to Mississippi. It can grow in either sunny or shady conditions.

References

External links

laevigatus
Flora of the Southeastern United States
Flora of New Jersey
Flora of Ohio
Flora of Pennsylvania
Flora of the Appalachian Mountains
Plants described in 1789
Flora without expected TNC conservation status